The Design Museum Den Bosch (previously: Stedelijk Museum 's-Hertogenbosch, SM's) is a museum for modern art in 's-Hertogenbosch, The Netherlands.

Focus of the Design Museum 
The Design Museum focuses on contemporary visual arts and design. It is specialized in ceramic art and jewelry. Modern visual arts like paintings will be exhibited by the Noordbrabants Museum, not by the Design Museum

History 
The history of the museum starts in 1956, when the Royal Academy for Art and Design in 's-Hertogenbosch organized its first international exhibit. At about the same time, a study collection of ceramic objects was started. This service was then based in the Kruithuis. The Ceramics collection also moved to the Kruithuis, but was put in storage in 1981. The name became 'Museum het Kruithuis'. In 1988 the museum started to collect jewelry. This became an international collection going back to 1950.

In 1985 the museum officially became a Museum of Contemporary Art. A process of professionalization then started. The international exhibition program became more focused and ambitious. Meanwhile, the collection and library of the museum were made digitally accessible. The number of events, like guided tours, presentations and excursions increased, and so did the number of visitors.

By 1990 the Kruithuis had become too small due to the growth of the collection, and the professionalization of the organization. In 1994 the municipality of 's-Hertogenbosch then decided to expand the museum at the place where it was located. A new building was designed, which would integrate the Kruithuis. While waiting for completion, the museum and art loan moved to the Hekellaan, somewhat to the south. Many protests then succeeded in cancelling the design by architect Bořek Šípek. In 2002 the municipal government decided to cancel the plans at the Kruithuis, and to look for a location in the city center. This caused that from 2003 to 2013 the museum was located in an old commercial building in the Palace Quarter southwest of the Railway station. The Foundation for Visual Arts Loans did not move to the Palace Quarter, but moved to a building on Hinthamerstraat.

The design museum today 
In 2013 the Design Museum moved to a new building on the current location. It was designed by Hubert-Jan Henket. The building is situated behind the Noordbrabants Museum, and is actually connected to it.

In June 2018 the museum changed its name to Design Museum Den Bosch. It now focuses on the societal significance of design in past, present, and future. In 2019-2020 it got a lot of attention with its exhibition 'Design of the Third Reich' 

The museum is a member of the International Council of Museums and the Dutch Museum Association.

Jewelry 
The Design Museum is one of the most important institutes that collect and present the work of Dutch jewellery designers. It has a collection of about 1,500 pieces of jewelry. The collection was started by Yvonne Joris, former director of the museum. and is limited to the period from World War II till the present. It focuses on Dutch and American Jewelers.  

The museum maintains the archives of Gijs Bakker, Marion Herbst and Emmy van Leersum. The collection has jewelry by Arman, Jean Arp, César Baldaccini, Louise Bourgeois, Georges Braque, Alexander Calder, Jean Cocteau, André Derain, Max Ernst, Lucio Fontana, Meret Oppenheim Pablo Picasso, Man Ray, Rob Scholte en Carel Visser.

References

Museums in 's-Hertogenbosch
Ceramics museums
Jewellery museums
Contemporary crafts museums